Lesbian, gay, bisexual, and transgender+ (LGBT+) persons in Namibia face legal challenges not experienced by non-LGBT residents. Discrimination based on sexual orientation and gender identity is not banned in Namibia, and households headed by same-sex couples are not eligible for the same legal protections available to opposite-sex couples.

The climate for LGBT people in Namibia has eased in recent years. The country's leading LGBT advocacy group is OutRight Namibia, formed in March 2010 and officially registered in November 2010. It has organised Namibia's first pride parades and seeks to be "a voice for lesbian women, gay men, bisexuals and transgender and intersex people in Namibia". Other LGBT groups include MPower Community Trust, which provides awareness of sexual health for gay and bisexual men, the Namibian Gays and Lesbian Movement, which provides counselling and advice to LGBT people and organises educational programs to raise awareness of LGBT Namibians, Tulinam, an LGBT faith-based group, and Wings to Transcend Namibia, a transgender group.

History
Homosexuality and same-sex relations have been documented among various modern-day Namibian groups. Anal intercourse and sexual relations between women also occurred, though more rarely.

In the 1920s, German anthropologist Kurt Falk reported homosexuality and same-sex marriage ceremonies among the Ovambo, Nama, Herero and Himba peoples. Among the Herero, erotic friendships (known as ) between two people regardless of sex were common, and typically included anal intercourse. In the 1970s, Portuguese ethnographer Carlos Estermann observed an Ovambo tradition where men known as esenge would dress like women, do women's work and marry other men. Ovambo society believed they were possessed by female spirits.

Legality of same-sex sexual activity

In Namibia, there is no codified sodomy provision, but it remains a crime in the country under the Roman-Dutch common law in force. Sodomy has been defined as "unlawful and intentional sexual relations  between two human males." This therefore excludes sexual relations  by heterosexual couples or lesbians.

Section 299 of the Criminal Procedure Act of 2004 makes reference to evidentiary issues on a charge of sodomy or attempted sodomy. Schedule 1 of the Act groups sodomy together with a list of other crimes for which police are authorised to make an arrest without a warrant or to use of deadly force in the course of that arrest, among other aspects (Sections 38, 42, 44, 63 and 112). Public displays of affection between two men can be considered "immoral" behaviour, which is punishable under the Combating of Immoral Practices Act of 1980.

In August 2016, the United Nations Human Rights Committee released a report in Windhoek, Namibia's capital city, calling on the country to abolish its sodomy ban. Reacting to the committee's call, John Walters, the Ombudsman of Namibia whose office is mandated to promote and protect human rights, said that people should be free to live their lives as they see fit. Walters said:

The Government of Namibia informed the United Nations that it has currently no intentions to repeal the sodomy law. Several lawmakers expressed different opinions, however, National Council Chairperson Margaret Mensah-Williams said, "irrespective of how uncomfortable it is, it is time that we should talk about the LGBTI community. They are part of our communities." Yvonne Dausab, chairperson of the Law Reform and Development Commission, said that the Constitution of Namibia lacks "sufficient language to describe and protect rights pertaining to the LGBTI plus community". At a roundtable hosted in 2019 by the ombudsman to address equal protection for Namibia's LGBT community, several lawmakers called for these issues to be tackled urgently.

In June 2019, following the repeal of Botswana's sodomy law by its High Court, First Lady Monica Geingos called for the repeal of Namibia's sodomy law, saying that the "sodomy law's days are numbered" and "Namibia will be next".

Recognition of same-sex relationships

In 2001, a Namibian woman and her German partner, Elisabeth Frank, sued to have their relationship recognised so that Frank could reside in Namibia. The Immigration Board granted the residence permit, and the State appealed to the Supreme Court. While the court ruled that Frank should be given a permanent residence permit, which she received a year later, it did not rule in favour of same-sex relationships.

The Ombudsman of Namibia spoke in August 2016 on the matter of same-sex marriage and said the following:

In December 2017, a case was brought to the High Court by Namibian citizen Johann Potgieter who married his South African husband Daniel Digashu in South Africa in 2015. The couple filed a lawsuit against the Namibian Government to have their 2015 South African marriage recognised in Namibia. In January 2018, Digashu won a court petition to allow him to enter Namibia as the High Court continues to review their case. The ombudsman said that he is not opposed to the recognition of their marriage in Namibia.

In 2018, a second case was filed by Namibian-born lawyer Anita Grobler and her South African spouse, Susan Jacobs, who have been together in a relationship for over 25 years, in an attempt to have their 2009 South African marriage recognized in Namibia and to obtain residence rights for Jacobs. A third case was filed in 2018 by Anette Seiler-Lilles and her German wife Anita Seiler-Lilles, who have been together since 1998. The couple seeks to have their 2017 German marriage recognized in Namibia.

In June 2019, Judge President Petrus Damaseb directed that a full bench of three judges should be designated to hear all pending cases. Ombudsman John Walters argues that marriage should be opened to couples irrespective of gender. Walters is one of eight respondents cited in the case; the other seven respondents include the Minister of Home Affairs and Immigration and the Attorney General who have both filed notices against same-sex marriage.

Discrimination protections
Discrimination on the basis of sexual orientation and gender identity is not outlawed in Namibia. The Namibian Constitution includes the category "social status", which could be interpreted as covering LGBT people.

Namibia is one of the rare cases in which a provision protecting people from discrimination based on sexual orientation was repealed by a legislative body. As early as 1992, local activists successfully lobbied to include "sexual orientation" among the prohibited grounds of discrimination in the Labour Act 1992. In 2004, a new labour law was discussed in Parliament and the inclusion of the term was a topic of heated debates, resulting in the exclusion of the term from the final text. However, this law never came into force. The Labour Act 2007 currently in force does not include sexual orientation among the prohibited grounds of discrimination.

In August 2016, the United Nations Human Rights Committee called on the Government of Namibia to adopt legislation explicitly prohibiting discrimination based on sexual orientation, including in the Labour Act (Act No. 11 of 2007). Following the committee's call, the Ombudsman of Namibia, argued that a measure prohibiting discrimination on the ground of sexual orientation needs to be in the Constitution.

Hate crime laws
LGBT people in Namibia face discrimination, harassment and violence. Additionally, similarly to neighbouring South Africa, lesbians are occasionally the victims of so-called corrective rape, where male rapists purport to raping the lesbian victim with the intent of 'curing' her of her sexual orientation.

In August 2016, the United Nations Human Rights Committee called on Namibia to adopt hate crime legislation punishing homophobic and transphobic violence, and vigorously enforce it.

Gender identity and expression
The Births, Marriages and Deaths Registration Act 81 of 1963 states that: "The Secretary may on the recommendation of the Secretary of Health, alter in the birth register
of any person who has undergone a change of sex, the description of the sex of such person and may for this purpose call for such medical reports and institute such investigations as he may deem necessary."

It was reported in 2015 that applications for change of sex are done on a case-by-case basis and are not problematic, as long as a person can provide medical reports of their sex change, which includes undergoing sex reassignment surgery. Once the application is granted, a transgender person can apply for a new identity document and passport.

In addition, a transgender person who has not had a "change of sex" could possibly use the Identification Act 2 of 1996. The act states that "if an identity document does not reflect correctly the particulars of the person to whom it was issued, or contains a photograph which is no longer a recognizable image of that person" the Minister shall cancel it and replace it with an improved identity document.

Blood donation
Individuals seeking to donate blood in Namibia must not have had more than one sexual partner within the past six months, irrespective of sexual orientation and gender. People "suspect of having contracted a sexually-transmitted disease such as HIV or syphilis" are not allowed to donate.

Public opinion
A 2016 Afrobarometer opinion poll found that 55% of Namibians would welcome, or would not be bothered by having, a homosexual neighbour. Namibia was one of only four countries in Africa polled with a majority in favour, the others being South Africa, Cape Verde and Mozambique.

Living conditions
In 2005, the Deputy Minister of Home Affairs and Immigration, Teopolina Mushelenga, claimed that lesbians and gay men betrayed the fight for Namibian freedom, were responsible for the HIV/AIDS pandemic, and were an insult to African culture. In 2001, President Sam Nujoma warned about forthcoming purges against gays and lesbians in Namibia, saying "the police must arrest, imprison and deport homosexuals and lesbians found in Namibia." Home Affairs Minister Jerry Ekandjo in 2000 urged 700 newly graduated police officers to "eliminate" gays and lesbians "from the face of Namibia".

Mr Gay Namibia 2011, Wendelinus Hamutenya, was the victim of a homophobic assault in December 2011 in Windhoek.

In November 2012, Ricardo Amunjera was crowned Mr Gay Namibia. The pageant took place at a theatre-restaurant in the capital city, Windhoek. Amunjera went on to later marry his Motswana life partner Marc Omphemetse Themba in South Africa in 2013.

In December 2013, McHenry Venaani, the president of the Popular Democratic Movement (formerly DTA), spoke out in favor of LGBT rights and said that people should be allowed to live their private lives without interference.

There are reports of a widespread use of religious gay conversion therapy practices in Namibia.

Activism
Namibia's first pride march took place in Windhoek in December 2013. It was attended by about 100 people. The city of Swakopmund held its first pride parade in June 2016. They both have continued annually since then and have not faced any impediments by the Namibian Government. In June 2017, around 200 people marched in a pride parade in Windhoek, and in December 2018, hundreds of people marched in parades in the cities of Windhoek and Swakopmund.

In 2017, the Diversity Alliance of Namibia (DAN) was formed. The DAN is a collective of organisations representing sexual and gender minorities in Namibia. It includes the following organisations: Rights not Rescue Trust (RnRT), Tulinam, Young Feminist Movement of Namibia (Y-FEM), OutRight Namibia (ORN), Wings to Transcend Namibia (WTTN), Transgender Intersex and Androgynous Movement of Namibia (TIAMON), Rights for all Movement (RAM), Rural Dialogue Namibia, MPower Community Trust, and Voice of Hope Trust (VHT). The Alliance has elected Tulinam and RnRT as chair and vice-chair, respectively, and ORN as a secretariat and coordinating mechanism.

On 17 May 2018, the International Day Against Homophobia, Transphobia and Biphobia, the Outreach Health drop-in-centre, which is Namibia's first LGBT health centre, was launched by OutRight Namibia in Windhoek.

In November 2017, the first Namibian Lesbian Festival was held in Windhoek. More than sixty young lesbians from eight regions came together for a week of public performances and creative expression, with poetry, stories, music, drama and dance. The second edition of the festival occurred in November 2018.

A few denominations, including the Evangelical Lutheran Church in the Republic of Namibia, tolerate LGBT Christians. Madelene Isaacks, a lesbian Christian, started the faith-based organisation Tulinam to help create safe spaces for sexual minorities in Namibian churches.

Political support
Support for LGBT rights among Namibian political parties is divided.

Parties that support LGBT rights include the All People's Party and the Popular Democratic Movement. Parties that oppose LGBT rights include the Namibian Economic Freedom Fighters and the SWAPO Party Youth League. Other parties such as Affirmative Repositioning have no official stance on the issue.

Summary table

See also

 LGBT rights in Africa
 Human rights in Africa
 Same-sex union court cases

References

External links
UK government travel advice for Namibia: Local laws and customs. Foreign & Commonwealth Office
Namibia content at International Lesbian and Gay Association

LGBT in Namibia
Namibia
Law of Namibia
Human rights in Namibia
Politics of Namibia